TNU may refer to:

Tajik National University
Tavrida National V.I. Vernadsky University, Ukraine
Televisión Nacional Uruguay
Tianjin Normal University, China
Thái Nguyên University, Vietnam
Trevecca Nazarene University, United States
Tungnan University, Taiwan
Newton Municipal Airport (Iowa), with FAA code "TNN"
Terrestrial Neutrino Units, a measurement of geoneutrinos
The Neotia University, Bengal, India